E65 may refer to:
 BMW E65/E66, a BMW car platform
 Eiffel 65, a Europop band from Italy
 European route E65, a north-south route connecting Malmö in Sweden and Chaniá in Greece 
 Nokia E65, a smartphone
 An envelope size (110mm × 220mm, holds ⅓ A4), also known as DL 
 Shin-Kūkō Expressway, route E65 in Japan